Jethi is the surname of the following people

Surname
Deepak Jethi, Indian actor
Karun Jethi (born in 1983), Canadian cricketer
Vijay Jethi (born in 1994), Indian cricketer

Given name
Jethi Sipahimalani (1906-1978), Sindhi politician

Place
Jethi Bahurani, Himalayan mountain in Nepal